Anyuan Miners' Strike Memorial Hall is a museum in Anyuan District, China. The museum memorializes part of the early revolutionary activity of Mao Zedong. Li Lisan and Liu Shaoqi are also commemorated.

References

Museums in Hunan